Australian non-residential architectural styles are a set of Australian architectural styles that apply to buildings used for purposes other than residence and have been around only since the first colonial government buildings of early European settlement of Australia in 1788.

Their distribution follows closely the establishment and growth of the different colonies of Australia, in that the earliest colonial buildings can be found in New South Wales and Tasmania.

The classifications set out below are derived from a leading Australian text.

Old Colonial Period (1788)
 Old Colonial Georgian; Old Colonial Regency; Old Colonial Grecian; Old Colonial Gothic Picturesque

Old Colonial Georgian

Old Colonial Regency

Old Colonial Grecian

Old Colonial Gothic Picturesque

Victorian period

Victorian Georgian
An extension and continuation of the Old Colonial Georgian style into the Victorian era. Georgian style houses built before c.1840 are characterised as Old Colonial Georgian, while buildings between c.1840 and c.1890 are characterised as Victorian Georgian. Both styles are essentially the same, being characterised by symmetrical facades, simple rectangular and prismatic shapes, and orderliness. Six and eight paned windows were common.

Victorian Regency
As with Victorian Georgian architecture, the Victorian Regency style was a continuation of the Old Colonial Regency style into the Victorian era (c.1840 – c.1890). A more elegant and refined form of the Georgian style.

Victorian Egyptian

Victorian Academic Classical

Victorian Free Classical

Victorian Filigree

Victorian Mannerist

Notable examples in Australia include:  Culwulla Chambers (Sydney); Old Police Station, The Rocks  Block Arcade (Melbourne); Stalbridge Chambers (Melbourne), National Bank Pall Mall (Bendigo); RESI Chambers (Melbourne); Lygon Buildings, Medley Hall (Carlton, Victoria); Former Money Order Post Office and Savings Bank (Melbourne); Mutual Store (Melbourne);

Victorian Second Empire

Notable examples include: Sydney Town Hall (Sydney); Hotel Windsor (Melbourne); Princess Theatre (Melbourne); Former Records Office (Melbourne); Melbourne General Post Office (Melbourne);  Melbourne Town Hall (Melbourne); East Melbourne Synagogue (East Melbourne, Victoria); Royal Exhibition Building (Carlton, Victoria); Collingwood Town Hall (Collingwood, Victoria); South Melbourne Town Hall (South Melbourne, Victoria); Malvern Town Hall (Malvern, Victoria); Former Rechabite Hall (Prahran, Victoria); Brunswick Town Hall (Brunswick, Victoria); Camberwell Town Hall (Camberwell, Victoria); Bendigo Town Hall (Bendigo, Victoria); Shamrock Hotel (Bendigo Victoria); Bendigo Courthouse (Bendigo, Victoria); Bendigo Post Office (Bendigo, Victoria); Institute of Technology (Bendigo, Victoria); Queensland Parliament House (Brisbane)

Victorian Italianate

Victorian Romanesque

Victorian Renaissance Revival

Victorian Byzantine

Victorian Academic Gothic

Victorian Free Gothic

Victorian Tudor (Jacobethan)

Victorian Rustic Gothic

Victorian Carpenter Gothic

Edwardian period (1910)
Edwardian architecture is generally less ornate than high or late Victorian architecture, apart from a subset - used for major buildings - known as Edwardian Baroque architecture.

Edwardian Baroque
Notable examples include the Lands Administration Building in Brisbane, the Queen Victoria Hospital, Melbourne (main pavilion, now Queen Victoria Women's Centre), the Commonwealth Offices, Treasury Place, Melbourne, the Department of Education building in Sydney (1912) and the General Post Office in Hobart.

Federation period
12 styles, each style name prefaced by "Federation":
Academic Classical, Free Classical, Filigree, Anglo-Dutch, Romanesque, Gothic, Carpenter Gothic, Warehouse, Queen Anne, Free Style, Arts and Crafts, Bungalow

Federation Academic Classical

Federation Free Classical
Notable examples include: Sydney Hospital (Sydney), Taronga Zoo Pavilion (Sydney), the main terminus building of the Central railway station in Sydney, Flinders Street station (Melbourne), Sacred Heart Church (St Kilda, Victoria), Read's Emporium (Prahran, Victoria), Old Royal Hotel (Williamstown, Victoria), the former Queensland Lands Administration Building (Brisbane).

Federation Second Empire

Federation Filigree

Federation Anglo-Dutch

Federation Romanesque

Federation Gothic

Federation Carpenter Gothic

Federation Warehouse

Federation Queen Anne

Federation Free Style

Federation Arts and Crafts

Federation Bungalow

Inter-War period (')
16 styles, each style name prefaced by "Inter-War":
Georgian Revival, Academic Classical, Free Classical, Beaux-Arts, Stripped Classical, Commercial Palazzo, Mediterranean, Spanish Mission, Chicagoesque, Functionalist & Modern, Art-Deco, Skyscraper Gothic, Romanesque, Interwar Gothic, Old English, California Bungalow

Inter-war Georgian Revival

Inter-war Academic Classical

Inter-war Free Classical

Inter-war Beaux Arts

Inter-war Stripped Classical

Inter-war Commercial Palazzo

Inter-war Mediterranean

Inter-War Spanish Mission

Inter-war Art Deco

Federation Skyscraper Gothic

Inter-war Chicagoesque

 Ballarat House, Wentworth Avenue, Surry Hills; 1915
 Former Cleveland Shoe Company Factory, Victoria Street, Erskineville; 1923
 Former Wrigley's Factory, Crewe Place, Rosebery; 1919

Inter-war Functionalist & Moderne

Interwar Gothic

Inter-war Old English (20th Century Tudorbethan)

Inter-War Functionalist & Moderne
The functionalist and moderne style often used combinations of blonde and brown bricks in linear vertical or horizontal patterns.
Notable examples include: Museum of Contemporary Art (Sydney); Captain's Flat Hotel (NSW); Russell Street Police Headquarters (Melbourne); Astor Theatre (St Kilda, Victoria); Ballarat Law Courts (Ballarat);

Post-War Period (c. 19401960)
5 styles, each style name prefaced by "Post-War":
Ecclesiastical, International, Modern

Ecclesiastical

International Style

Modern

Late Twentieth-Century Period 19602000
14 styles, each style name prefaced by "Late Twentieth Century":
Stripped Classical, Ecclesiastical, International, Organic, Brutalist, Structuralist, Late Modern, Post Modern, Immigrants' Nostalgic

Stripped Classical

International

Organic

Brutalist

Notable examples include: Sydney Masonic Centre/Civic Tower (Sydney); Suncorp Place (Sydney); Sydney Law School (Sydney); Cameron Offices (Canberra); High Court of Australia (Canberra); State Library of Queensland (Brisbane); Queensland Performing Arts Centre (Brisbane); Law Courts (Brisbane); Suncorp Plaza (Brisbane); National Gallery of Victoria (Melbourne); Total carpark (Melbourne); WTC Wharf; Harold Holt Memorial Swimming Centre (Malvern, Victoria); St Kilda Public Library (St Kilda, Victoria); Plumbing Trades Employees Union of Australia Building (Melbourne); University of Melbourne Faculty of Engineering (Melbourne); Metropolitan Fire Brigade (East Melbourne, Victoria); R.A.W. Woodgate Centre (Kew, Victoria); UTS Tower (University of Technology, Sydney); St Anthony's Church (Marsfield, Sydney). See :Category:Brutalist architecture in Australia.

Structuralist

Late Modern

Post Modern

A subset of postmodernism is mock-historicism tries to imitate historic styles using modern materials to the point where it is difficult to tell them apart from historic buildings.  The most imitated styles are those that are easiest to clone (including the Georgian style).

Deconstructivist

Notable examples include Green Building RMIT; Deakin University main building; Australian Centre for Contemporary Art; Gottlieb House (Melbourne)

Immigrant's Nostalgic

21st-century architecture
Several new and continued 20th-century styles, all prefaced with "21st-century" - Deconstructivist, Post modern, Structuralist, Sustainable, Modern

Deconstructivist

Notable examples include Fed Square; Shrine of Remembrance crypt; Sofo House (Melbourne) Swan Bells (Perth)

Post Modern

Structuralist
Advanced structuralism facilitated by Computer Aided Design

Sustainable

Notable examples in Australia include: 60L (Melbourne); CH2 (Melbourne); K2 Apartments (Windsor, Victoria); Dunc Gray Velodrome (Sydney); Forest EcoCentre (Tasmania); Rozak House (Noonamah, Northern Territory).

Green building

Modern

See also 

 List of Australian architects
 List of architectural styles

References

Bibliography 
 Apperly, Richard; Irving, Robert; Reynolds, Peter (1989). "A Pictorial Guide to Identifying Australian Architecture: Styles and Terms from 1788 to the Present," Angus & Robertson.
Ulrike Laule, Rolf Toman, Achim Bednorz - Architecture of the Middle Ages - Background to the Gothic Revival style.
 George Wilkie - Building Your Own Home - Section on Architectural Styles
 https://www.webcitation.org/query?url=http://www.geocities.com/asiedydd/styles.htm&date=2009-10-25+12:44:01
 http://www.canberrahouse.com.au/organic.html
 http://www.wiki.jeremymacpherson.net/index.php?title=Research_Guide_1:_Buildings#Key_Architectural_Styles
 sydneyarchitecture.com Chronology of Styles in Australian Architecture- https://web.archive.org/web/20140908110249/http://sydneyarchitecture.com/STYLES/search-style.htm

External links 
 Photo of St Paul's Cathedral taken from the steps of Flinders Street Station

Architectural styles
Architecture in Australia